Denisa Sokolovská (born 27 May 1971, Jaroměř, Hradec Králové Region, Czechoslovakia) is a retired Czech rhythmic gymnast.

She competed for Czechoslovakia in the rhythmic gymnastics all-around competition at the 1988 Olympic Games in Seoul. She tied for 14th place in the qualification and advanced to the final, placing 12th overall.

References

External links 
 Denisa Sokolovská at Sports-Reference.com

1971 births
Living people
Czechoslovak rhythmic gymnasts
Gymnasts at the 1992 Summer Olympics
Olympic gymnasts of Czechoslovakia